Honi Gordon Sings is the only album recorded as a leader by jazz vocalist Honi Gordon.

Background
Honi Gordon sang as a member of the Gordons (with her father and two brothers) in the early 1950s. Her first recordings, in 1953, were with them.

Recording and music
Honi Gordon Sings was recorded on March 23, 1962. The other musicians on the recording are Makanda Ken McIntyre (alto sax, flute), Wally Richardson (guitar), Jaki Byard (piano), George Duvivier (bass), and Ed Shaughnessy (drums).

Releases
The album was originally released on LP by Prestige Records. It was re-released on CD in 1992.

Reception
The AllMusic reviewer commented that the album presented "bop-based jazz singing at its best." Gordon's version of "Strollin'" was described as "definitive".

Track listing
"Strollin'"
"Ill Wind"
"My Kokomo"
"Why Try to Change Me Now?"
"Cupid"
"Walkin' (Out the Door)"
"Why"
"Love Affair"
"Lament of the Lonely"

Personnel
Honi Gordon – vocals
Ken McIntyre  – alto sax, flute
Wally Richardson – guitar
Jaki Byard – piano
George Duvivier – bass
Ed Shaughnessy – drums

References

1962 albums
Prestige Records albums